is the debut studio album by Japanese recording artist and producer Nariaki Obukuro, released on April 25, 2018 as his first solo album, under Sony Music Japan sublabel Epic Records Japan. The album was produced by Japanese-American singer songwriter Hikaru Utada.

Promotion 
In order to promote the album, Obukuro performed in several TV shows and musical events. Many interviews were done to magazines and internet websites.

Track listing

Charts

References

External links
Bunriha no Natsu on Nariaki Obukuro's Sony Music web site

2018 debut albums
Japanese-language albums
Sony Music albums
Epic Records albums